The National Basketball Association's (NBA) dress code was introduced originally on October 17, 2005 under NBA commissioner David Stern. The mandatory dress code for all NBA and NBA Development League players was especially noteworthy because it made the NBA the first major professional sports league to implement such rules, although National Hockey League rules previously stated that a player is supposed to wear a jacket and tie to games and on charters if not told otherwise by the head coach or general manager. The dress code went into effect at the start of the 2005–06 NBA season.

Details of the dress code
The dress code stated that all players must dress in business or conservative attire while arriving and departing during a scheduled game, on the bench while injured, and when conducting official NBA business (press interviews, charity events, etc.). The first dress code banned fashions most often associated with hip-hop culture, specifically: jerseys, jeans, hats, do-rags, T-shirts, large jewelry, sneakers and timber boots (specifically, Timberland-type boots).

This particular clothing was not allowed to be worn by players to interviews, games (on and off the bench), charity events, or any other occasion affiliated with the NBA and its developmental league. Violators of the dress code were to be fined or suspended upon repeat offenses. The dress code was developed with the intention of combating image problems that had plagued the NBA in recent history.

Under current NBA dress regulations, if a player does not dress to participate in a game, he must dress in a manner suitable for a coach. In the NBA, a suit or a sport coat used to be required for coaches, as well as a necktie. Since the 2020 NBA Bubble, coaches have been allowed to wear casual attire, with most opting for polo shirts and quarter-zips.

Supporting arguments
The league's image was in bad shape following the Pacers–Pistons brawl in 2004. Supporters also claim that most businesses require their employees to adhere to a dress code of some kind so the NBA is not making any unusual demands. Moreover, the NBA was not requiring players to wear a suit and tie, as had been rumored initially. Further, many NBA teams already had dress codes, as dictated by coaches or general managers. Penalties for non-compliance usually involved fines such as having to pay for one's own airfare to wherever the team was going, rather than flying on the team charter.

Opposing arguments
Critics such as Allen Iverson, Stephen Jackson and Paul Pierce claimed that the dress code would not change a person's character regardless of what type of clothing they wore, and that associating hip-hop style of dress with crime or a bad image is racist. Iverson was also quoted to say, "the dress code is not who I am and doesn't allow me to express myself."

Many NBA and non-NBA sports figures also claimed that it targeted young black males and hip-hop culture. Many NBA players are sponsored by casual wear brands such as Nike, Adidas, Puma and Converse.

Impact

Writing for Rolling Stone in 2016, Zack Graham said that although players were initially critical of the dress code, "Over the years, NBA players accepted, then embraced and eventually began to have fun with the new dress code, changing men's fashion in the process."

With Stern stepping down and Adam Silver becoming commissioner of the NBA in 2014, the dress code became more lenient, allowing players to be more expressive with what they wear.

References

External links
NBA Dress Code specifics at NBA.com

Dress code
Dress code
Clothing controversies
African-American-related controversies
Workwear
Casual wear
Rules of the National Basketball Association
Hip hop fashion
Dress codes

it:National Basketball Association#Codice di abbigliamento